Streetsboro is a city in western Portage County, Ohio, United States. The population was 17,260 at the 2020 census. It is part of the Akron metropolitan area. The city was formed from the former Streetsboro Township of the Connecticut Western Reserve.

History 
Long before settlers moved into the Connecticut Western Reserve, Seneca Indians traversed the area now called Streetsboro. They used Old Portage Trail, which crosses the southwest corner of the city, to go from Lake Erie to the Ohio River basin.

The founder of Streetsboro Township was Titus Street from Connecticut, who purchased the land in 1798. Streetsboro Township contained .

In 1825, a turnpike from Cleveland to Wellsville, Ohio, was laid by Frederick Wadsworth, Samuel Cowles, John Strauyhen, and Titus Street. Street agreed to give enough land to make it through the township. In 1827, the turnpike was completed.  It followed much of the route of the present Ohio State Route 14.

Major growth occurred in Streetsboro with the opening of the Ohio Turnpike on October 1, 1955, with Exit 13 (now known as Exit 187) initially being the only interchange in Portage County. By 1957, with the growth of the automobile industry, Streetsboro experienced a population explosion. Proximity to the Akron and Cleveland areas, along with direct access to Interstate 80 (Ohio Turnpike), Interstate 480, and State Routes 303, 43, and 14, have greatly contributed to the rapid growth of manufacturing, distribution, commercial and residential development in the past 50 years.

Streetsboro was primarily a farming community until 1970. Streetsboro was home to a small amusement park, Shady Lake Park, located on Route 14, which is now an apartment complex of the same name.

Due to the steady growth of Streetsboro and its surrounding area in the early 21st century, the city has become a retail hub for Portage County with the arrival of many national big-box retailers, including Walmart Supercenter, Target, Lowe's, The Home Depot, and Staples.  The first Northeast Ohio location for Sonic Drive-In opened in Streetsboro in September 2008.

Geography

Demographics

2010 census
As of the census of 2010,  16,028 people, 6,562 households, and 4,316 families were residing in the city. The 7,104 housing units averaged . The racial makeup of the city was 87.7% White, 7.9% African American, 0.2% Native American, 2.2% Asian, 0.3% from other races, and 1.8% from two or more races. Hispanics or Latinos of any race were 1.7% of the population.

Of the 6,562 households,  31.4% had children under 18 living with them, 50.3% were married couples living together, 11.1% had a female householder with no husband present, 4.4% had a male householder with no wife present, and 34.2% were not families. About 26.5% of all households were made up of individuals, and 6.8% had someone living alone who was 65 or older. The average household size was 2.43, and the average family size was 2.97.

The median age in the city was 37.9 years; 22.3% of residents were under  18, 8.3% were between  18 and 24; 30.5% were 25 to 44; 27% were  45 to 64; and 11.7% were 65  or older. The gender makeup of the city was 48.5% male and 51.5% female.

2000 census
As of the census of 2000,  12,311 people, 4,908 households, and 3,381 families were residing in the city. The population density was 512.6 people/sq mi (197.9/km). The racial makeup of the city was 95.39% White, 1.96% African American, 0.09% Native American, 1.37% Asian, 0.17% from other races, and 1.02% from two or more races. Hispanics or Latinos of any race were 0.78% of the population.

Of the 4,908 households,  31.1% had children under 18 living with them, 55.3% were married couples living together, 9.9% had a female householder with no husband present, and 31.1% were not families. About 25.1% of all households were made up of individuals, and 5.7% had someone living alone who was 65  or older. The average household size was 2.49, and the average family size was 3.00.

In the city, the age distribution was 24.3% under  18, 8.3% from 18 to 24, 35.8% from 25 to 44, 21.8% from 45 to 64, and 9.8% who were 65 or older. The median age was 34 years. For every 100 females, there were 96.7 males. For every 100 females age 18 and over, there were 93.6 males.

Males had a median income of $36,672 versus $27,835 for females. The per capita income for the city was $21,764. About 3.9% of families and 5.3% of the population were below the poverty line, including 7.5% of those under a18 and 6.1% of those 65 or over.

Education 
Primary and secondary education is provided mainly by the Streetsboro City School District, which includes four schools, while a small portion of the city is part of the neighboring Kent City School District.  Students in preschool through third grade attend Streetsboro Elementary School, formerly known as Campus Elementary School. Henry Defer Intermediate School serves students in grades four and five, with grades six through eight at Streetsboro Middle School. Streetsboro High School includes grades 9 through 12. All schools and the district offices, with the exception of Streetsboro High  School, are located on a  central campus with the Streetsboro City Park. The campus also includes the Pierce Streetsboro Library, a branch of the Portage County District Library, which opened in 1988.

Voters in the district approved a $38.7 million bond issue in 2013 to fund expansion and renovations of the district's facilities. Included in the plans were the new building for Streetsboro High School along State Route 14, and an expansion and renovation of the former Campus Elementary to become Streetsboro Elementary School for  preschool through grade three. Both of those projects were completed in December 2016, and the first classes held in January 2017. Additional plans include renovation of the former high school building to house Streetsboro Middle School, which will enable grade six to be moved to the middle school from Henry Defer Intermediate School, and repurposing the current middle school building.

Media

Radio
 WSTB 88.9 FM (Streetsboro High School-alternative rock Monday through Saturday, oldies on Sunday)

Print media
 Record-Courier, a 7-day daily newspaper, serves Portage County.

Notable people
Hester A. Benedict (1838-1921), poet and writer
Matthew Hannan, professional wrestler
Henry H. Wyatt, Civil War-era Union soldier and Wisconsin state assemblyman

References

External links

 City website
 City of Streetsboro Chamber of Commerce
 City of Streetsboro The Visitors and Convention Bureau

Cities in Portage County, Ohio
Populated places established in 1822
1822 establishments in Ohio
Cities in Ohio